Interstate 295 (I-295) is a highway which runs eastward and northward bypass of the cities of Richmond and Petersburg in the US state of Virginia. The southern terminus is an interchange with I-95 southeast of Petersburg. I-295 then has an interchange with I-64 east of Richmond, crosses I-95 north of Richmond, and continues westward to its other terminus at a second interchange with I-64.

Route description

I-295 serves as a bypass route around downtown Richmond for both I-64 and I-95. It also performs crossover duty for travelers between Washington DC (reached by I-95) and southeastern Virginia (reached by I-64) and links many of Richmond's suburbs (such as Short Pump, Mechanicsville, Highland Springs, Varina, and Hopewell).

The highway begins at I-95 exit 46, south of Petersburg in unincorporated Prince George County with two lanes in each direction. Exit 3 provides access to US Route 460 (US 460), the most direct route from Petersburg to the Hampton Roads area. At exit 9 (State Route 36 [SR 36]), the road widens to three lanes in each direction. Exit 15 provides access to SR 10, a major arterial that connects Hopewell to Hampton Roads. Exit 16 provides access to the Meadowville Technology Parkway immediately before the road crosses the James River on the Varina-Enon Bridge, built in 1990 and the second major cable-stayed bridge in the US. Exit 22 provides access to SR 5, a mostly scenic route between Richmond and Williamsburg. Exit 25 is for SR 895, a short toll connector to I-95 that also provides access to Richmond International Airport. The massive exit 28 provides access to both I-64 and US 60.

North of exit 28, the road widens to four lanes in each direction and bends to the northwest. Exit 31 is for SR 156 and northern access to Richmond International Airport. Exit 34 is for a local road, Creighton Road (SR 615). Exit 37 provides access to US 360. Exit 38 is for SR 627, which carries the local names Pole Green and Meadowbridge roads. Exit 41 is for US 301 and SR 2. Another large interchange complex (exit 43) marks the junction with both I-95 and US 1. The road reduces again to three lanes as it bends slightly to the southwest. Exit 45 is for Woodman Road, exit 49 is for US 33, and exit 51 is for Nuckols Road. I-295's northern terminus is at exit 53 with I-64. The northernmost  of the route are not signed with directional signs, as the compass direction of the route is slightly southwest–northeast, in contravention of the nominal direction of the rest of the route.

All of the exits are cloverleafs with the exceptions of: its southern terminus I-95 (exit 1), Meadowville Technology Parkway (exit 16), SR 895 (exit 25), and the northern terminus with I-64 (exit 53).

Additionally, as the road's primary purpose is to direct long-distance travel away from Downtown Richmond, control cities on guide signs for the road include cities such as Washington DC, Charlottesville, and Rocky Mount, North Carolina, as destinations. However, the highway goes to none of those cities, but instead uses such destinations to direct long-distance travelers away from the congested areas in Downtown Richmond and Petersburg. In the 1990s, Miami, Florida, was also listed as a control city on some guide signs north of Richmond, but these have been removed or changed.

Exit list

See also

References

External links

 I-295 on Kurumi.com
  
 I-295 on Interstate Guide

95-2 Virginia
95-2
2 Virginia
Interstate 295
Interstate 295
Interstate 295
Interstate 295
Interstate 295